Solidarity Civic Unity (UCS) is a political party in Bolivia. The party was founded on 15 August 1989 by Max Fernández, and is currently led by his son, Johnny Fernández.

UCS was part of the "Megacoalition" that supported the presidency of Hugo Banzer from 1997 to 2001. The coalition also included Banzer's Nationalist Democratic Action (ADN), the Revolutionary Left Movement (MIR), and Conscience of Fatherland (CONDEPA).

At the 2002 Bolivian general election, the party won 5.3% of the popular vote and five out of 130 seats in the Chamber of Deputies but no Senate seats.

See also 
:Category:Solidarity Civic Unity politicians

References

1989 establishments in Bolivia
Conservative parties in Bolivia
Liberal parties in Bolivia
Political parties established in 1989
Political parties in Bolivia
Populist parties
Social conservative parties